The Yavanajātaka (Sanskrit: yavana 'Greek' + jātaka 'nativity' = 'nativity according to the Greeks'), written by Sphujidhvaja, is an ancient text in Indian astrology.

According to David Pingree, it is a later versification of an earlier translation into Sanskrit of a Greek text, thought to have been written around 120 CE in Alexandria, on horoscopy. Based on Pingree's interpretation and emendations, the original translation, made in 149–150 CE by "Yavanesvara" ("Lord of the Greeks") under the rule of the Western Kshatrapa king Rudrakarman I, is lost; only a substantial portion of the versification 120 years later by Sphujidhvaja under Rudrasena II has survived. However, according to the recent research by Mak based on a newly discovered manuscript and other documents, Pingree's date interpretation as well as a number of crucial readings such as zero and other bhūtasaṃkhyā were based on his own emendation, not supported by what was written on the manuscripts. Furthermore, traditionally Yavanesvara and Sphujidhvaja were understood as referring to the same person, the former being an epithet to the latter, according to authors such as Bhaskara and Utpala. The date of the Yavanajātaka according to Mak is now revised to between 4th and 6th century CE.

Yavanajataka is one of the earliest known Sanskrit works referencing western horoscopy. It was followed by other works of Western origin which greatly influenced Indian astrology: the Paulisa Siddhanta ("Doctrine of Paul") and the Romaka Siddhanta ("Doctrine of the Romans"). However, some Indian authors claim the earliest known Sanskrit work on horoscopy is Vedanga Jyotisha 

It was translated by David Pingree into English, which was published as volume 48 of the Harvard Oriental Series in 1978.

Genesis
The last verses of the text describe the role of Yavanasvera in the creation of the text, and the role of Sphujidhvaja in its subsequent versification:

"Previously Yavanesvara (the lord of the Greeks), whose vision of the truth came by favor of the Sun and whose language is flawless, translated this ocean of words, this jewel-mine of horoscopy, which was guarded by its being written in his tongue (i.e., Greek), but the truth of which was seen by the foremost of kings (in the year) 71; (he translated) this science of genethlialogy for the instruction of the world by means of excellent words." (Chapter 79/60-61 The Yavanajataka of Sphujidhvaja)

"There was a wise king named Sphujidhvaja who versified this entire (text), which was seen by him in the year 191, in 4,000 indravajra verses." (Chapter 79/62 The Yavanajataka of Sphujidhvaja)

The dates employed in the Yavanajataka are based on the Saka era (see Chapter 79/14 "When 66 years of the Sakas have elapsed..."), meaning that the translation of the text into Sanskrit was made by Yavanasvera in 149 CE (year 71 of the Saka era, which starts in 78 CE). Accordingly, the versification by Sphujidhvaja was made in 269 CE.

The Yavanajataka contains instructions on calculating astrological charts (horoscopes) from the time and place of one's birth. Astrology flourished in the Hellenistic world (particularly Alexandria) and the Yavanajataka reflects astrological techniques developed in the Greek-speaking world.  Astronomical mathematical methods, such as the calculate of the 'horoskopos' (zodiac sign on the eastern horizon) was used in the service of astrology.

References to Greek astrology
There are various direct references to Greek astrological knowledge in the text, and the nomenclature is clearly taken from the Greek language:

"The seventh place from the ascendent, the descendent, is called jamitra (diametros) in the language of the Greeks; the tenth from the ascendent, the mid-heaven, they say, is the mesurana (mesouranema)." (Chapter 1/49 The Yavanajataka of Sphujidhvaja)

"This is said to be the method of determining the strength or weakness of the signs and planets according to the teaching of the Greeks; they say that, of the complete set of influences in horoscopy, there is an enormous number..." (Chapter 1/92 The Yavanajataka of Sphujidhvaja)

"Thirty-six are the thirds of the zodiacal signs which are called Drekanas (dekanos) by the Greeks. They have various clothes, forms, and colors; I will describe them with all their qualities beginning with their characteristic signs." (Chapter 3/1 The Yavanajataka of Sphujidhvaja)

"The rule concerning the actions of people which was described by the foremost (astrologers) of the Greeks with respect to the planetary week-days is to be established in a similar rule with respect to the hours (horai) which pass through the days" (Chapter 77/9 The Yavanajataka of Sphujidhvaja)

"If the ascendant is an upacaya of his birth-ascendant and is occupied by a benefit planet, but not conjoined with a malefic, and if the Moon is in a good and favourable sign, the Greeks say that he always succeeds in his undertakings." (Chapter 78/3 The Yavanajataka of Sphujidhvaja)

"The wise say that the observed course of the planets is the supreme eye of the entire body of the rules of horoscopy. I shall explain it concisely according to the instruction of the Greeks." (Chapter 79/1 The Yavanajataka of Sphujidhvaja)

"Some who are students of the laws (of astronomy) find that it is good to follow the opinion of the sage Vasistha; (but according to) the best of the Greeks (the yuga) should consist of 165 years." (Chapter 79/3 The Yavanajataka of Sphujidhvaja)

See also
 Indo-Greek kingdom
 Paulisa Siddhanta
 Romaka Siddhanta

Notes

References
 Thomas McEvilley (2002) The Shape of Ancient Thought, Allworth Press, 
 David Pingree (1981) "Jyotiḥśāstra", Jan Gonda (ed) A History of Indian Literature, Vol, VI Fasc. 4, Otto Harrassowitz — Wiesbaden 
 K. V. Sarma (1997), "Sphujidhvaja", Encyclopaedia of the History of Science, Technology, and Medicine in Non-Western Cultures edited by Helaine Selin, Springer, 
 Bill M. Mak (2014) The ‘Oldest Indo-Greek Text in Sanskrit’ Revisited: Additional Readings from the Newly Discovered Manuscript of the Yavanajātaka, Journal of Indian and Buddhist Studies 62(3): 1101-1105
 Bill M. Mak (2013) The Last Chapter of Sphujidhvaja's Yavanajātaka critically edited with notes, SCIAMVS 14, pp. 59-148	
 Bill M. Mak (2013) The Date and Nature of Sphujidhvaja’s Yavanajātaka reconsidered in the light of some newly discovered materials, History of Science in South Asia 1: pp. 1-20
 

Indian literature
Hindu astrological texts
Sanskrit texts